Andrew Tsien Chih-ch'un (9 April 1926 – 18 February 2009) was the third Catholic bishop of Hwalien. He was ordained a priest in Taipei in 1953. He was appointed bishop after Paul Shan Kuo-hsi was appointed bishop of Kaohsiung. He retired in 2001.

References
Andrew Tsien Chih-ch'un's obituary

1926 births
2009 deaths
20th-century Roman Catholic bishops in Taiwan